

External links

1974
Films
Mexican